Up the Bracket is the debut album by English indie rock band The Libertines, released in October 2002. It reached #35 in the UK Albums Chart. The album was part of a resurgence for the British indie/alternative scene and received widespread praise from critics and has quickly become considered one of the greatest albums of the 2000s.

The album's cover is based on an image of riot police squaring up to protesters during the Argentine economic crisis of 1999–2002.

Title
The title Up the Bracket alludes to a phrase used by English comedian Tony Hancock, of whom the Libertines' Pete Doherty is an avid fan. In Hancock's Half Hour, "Up The Bracket" is a slang term meaning a punch in the throat. Hancock is also referenced in the opening track, "Vertigo" – "lead pipes, your fortune's made", being a line from the Half Hour episode "The Poetry Society".

Release
The album was re-released on 8 September 2003 with an additional track, "What a Waster" and DVD featuring the promotional videos for the singles: "Up the Bracket", "Time for Heroes" and "I Get Along".

Reception

Upon release, Up the Bracket received generally favourable reviews. Online music magazine Pitchfork placed Up the Bracket at number 138 on their list of top 200 albums of the 2000s, and it was placed 44 on a similar list by Uncut. NME placed the album tenth in a list of the greatest British albums ever, as well as calling it the second greatest album of the decade. NME also placed the album number 70 on its list of the 500 Greatest Albums of All Time. Rolling Stone placed the album number 61 on its list of the 100 Greatest Debut Albums of All Time and number 94 on its list of the 100 Greatest Albums of the 2000s.

In April 2008, BBC Radio 1 DJ Zane Lowe chose the album as one of his Masterpieces, playing the album in full with interviews from the band members, fans and fellow musicians who were influenced by the album.

Track listing
All songs written by Pete Doherty and Carl Barât.
 "Vertigo" – 2:37
 "Death on the Stairs" – 3:24
 "Horrorshow" – 2:34
 "Time for Heroes" – 2:40
 "Boys in the Band" – 3:42
 "Radio America" – 3:44
 "Up the Bracket" – 2:40
 "Tell the King" – 3:22
 "The Boy Looked at Johnny" – 2:38
 "Begging" – 3:20
 "The Good Old Days" – 2:59
 "I Get Along" – 2:51
Bonus tracks

"What a Waster" is listed as track 13 on US, Canadian, Spanish, Japanese and UK reissue editions

Chart performance

Footnotes

2002 debut albums
The Libertines albums
Rough Trade Records albums